is a vertically scrolling shooter developed and manufactured by Sega for the Master System in 1986. Set in space, the player flies a spaceship shooting enemies and collecting power-ups to reach the mother ship of an invasion force. It was originally a bundled game that came with the console in Europe.

The game received positive reviews upon release, praising the graphics, weapons and large number of enemies; later retrospective reviews have been more mixed, with critics criticising the generic nature and lack of variety. The game was re-released on the Hang-On / Astro Warrior compilation in North America, and the Astro Warrior / Pit Pot compilation in Europe. In 1996, Tec Toy re-released the game in Brazil as Sapo Xulé: SOS Lagoa Poluída, and based it on a Brazilian 1980s toy. This version was also released in Portugal.

Plot

The Devil Star Imperial Forces have established a base on and invaded the Alpha Kentowry system. The Solar System Allied Forces have entrusted their Warrior, aboard The Astoro Raider, to attack the invasion force and destroy their mother ship.

Gameplay

The game is a top down shooter, taking place through three levels with a boss at the end of each. Astro Warrior'''s three levels have many different kinds of enemies that attack in various patterns. The stages have no obstacles. Power-ups can be collected by shooting targets on the ground. These include ship speed increase, a stronger laser weapon, and two Gradius-style options. Capturing Weapons Supply Ships increases the Astoro Raider's speed and firing ability. The player starts with three lives, and if all are lost, the game is over. If the player dies, all power-ups are lost.

HistoryAstro Warrior was originally a bundled game that came with the Master System in Europe.Astro Warrior was re-released as Sapo Xulé: SOS Lagoa Poluída by Tec Toy in Brazil in 1996. The game was also released in Portugal. Sapo Xulé: SOS Lagoa Poluída is based on a popular Brazilian 1980s toy, and set underwater, with the Astoro Raider replaced with a submarine.

Reception

Upon release in the late 1980s, the game received generally positive reviews from contemporary critics. British magazine Computer and Video Games gave it an 82% score. They praised the "extra weapons and "plenty of baddies" to destroy. They said "this freebie is really neat" and is "well worth the effort to get hold of a copy" if "shoot 'em ups are tops in your" house. German magazine Happy Computer'' gave it a 79% score. They praised the graphics, calling them truly remarkable, and saying the system's colourful sprite varieties are exploited.

In the late 2000s, the game received mixed retrospective reviews from online critics. GameFreaks 365 criticised the game, citing the background, "worthless" bosses, and the game being too generic, but complimented the "nicely done" colourful presentation. IMPLANTgames criticised the lack of variety, the mediocre enemies, but complimented the music.

References

Sources

External links

1986 video games
Master System games
Master System-only games
Sega video games
Shoot 'em ups
Vertically scrolling shooters
Video games set in outer space
Video games developed in Japan